Lucas Rey (born 11 October 1982) is an Argentine field hockey midfielder, who plays club hockey in his native country for San Fernando. He is a member of the Men's National Team since 2002, and finished in 11th position at the 2004 Summer Olympics in Athens. Rey was also on the side ended up fifth at the 2003 Champions Trophy in Amstelveen, and won the 2005 Champions Challenge tournament in Alexandria, Egypt.  Lucas has also won the bronze medal at the 2014 Men's Hockey World Cup, two medals at the Pan American Games and two Champions Challenge. He now works as a physical education teacher at Cardenal Pironio’s school, in Nordelta, Buenos Aires.

External links
 
Profile on Athens 2004-website

1982 births
Living people
Argentine male field hockey players
Olympic field hockey players of Argentina
Field hockey players at the 2004 Summer Olympics
Field hockey players at the 2007 Pan American Games
Field hockey players at the 2011 Pan American Games
Field hockey players at the 2012 Summer Olympics
Field hockey players at the 2016 Summer Olympics
Field hockey players from Buenos Aires
Pan American Games gold medalists for Argentina
Pan American Games silver medalists for Argentina
Olympic gold medalists for Argentina
Olympic medalists in field hockey
Medalists at the 2016 Summer Olympics
Pan American Games medalists in field hockey
Hockey India League players
Medalists at the 2007 Pan American Games
Medalists at the 2011 Pan American Games
2010 Men's Hockey World Cup players
2014 Men's Hockey World Cup players
21st-century Argentine people